General Burke may refer to:

John Burke (spy) (1830–1871), Confederate Adjutant General of Texas
Rosetta Burke (born 1937), U.S. Army Reserve major general

See also
Edward Burke-Gaffney (1900–1981), British Army major general
Attorney General Burke (disambiguation)